Arbieto Canton is one of the cantons of the Arbieto Municipality, the third municipal section of the Esteban Arce Province in the Cochabamba Department in central Bolivia. Its seat is Arbieto (1,347 inhabitants, census 2001).

References 

  Instituto Nacional de Estadistica de Bolivia  (INE)

External links
 Map of Esteban Arce Province

Cantons of Cochabamba Department
Cantons of Bolivia